Dunnstown is a town in Victoria, Australia.

History
Dunn's Town Post Office opened on 21 November 1864, was renamed Dunn's Town Railway Station PO in 1884, Dunnstown in 1909 and closed in 1980.

Brind's Distillery, a former whiskey distillery complex on Old Melbourne Road, is listed on the Victorian Heritage Register. It is Victoria's last surviving example of a pot still distillery. In 1893, the distillery employed nearly one third of those working in Victorian distilleries. Parts of the complex have been used more recently for bottling spring water.

Today
The town has an Australian Rules football team competing in the Central Highlands Football League. A tourist attraction, Kryal Castle is located there.

References

External links

Towns in Victoria (Australia)